Ship Without a Harbour is a 1932 German thriller film directed by Harry Piel and starring Piel, Trude Berliner and Charly Berger. The film was made at the Staaken Studios and at the Berlin Wintergarten. The film's sets were designed by Willi Herrmann. It was partly shot on location at the North German port of Bremerhaven.

Cast
Harry Piel as Seepolizist Klaus Hansen
Ingrid Lindström as Kitty Korff, seine Frau
Trude Berliner as Lilly Steffens
Hans Lorenz as Steuermann Jochen Hübner, ihr Geliebter
Eugen Rex as Seepolizist Martin
Charly Berger as Seepolizist Behrendt 
Philipp Manning as Inspektor Burghardt
Friedrich Kayßler as Chef der Seepolizei
Paul Rehkopf as Kapitän
Bruno Ziener as Theaterdirektor
Erwin Fichtner as ein Kollege Hansens
Maria Forescu as Lokalinhaberin
Ida Krill as Aufwartefrau im Theater
Klaus Seiwert as Kollege Hansens

References

Bibliography 
 Grange, William. Cultural Chronicle of the Weimar Republic. Scarecrow Press, 2008.

External links 
 

1932 films
1930s thriller films
Films of the Weimar Republic
German thriller films
1930s German-language films
Films directed by Harry Piel
Seafaring films
German black-and-white films
1930s German films
Films shot in Berlin